Antoine Ó Raifteirí (also Antoine Ó Reachtabhra, Anthony Raftery; 30 March 1779 – 25 December 1835) was an Irish language poet who is often called the last of the wandering bards.

Biography
Antoine Ó Raifteirí was born in Killedan, near Kiltimagh in County Mayo.  His father was a weaver.  He had come to Killedan from County Sligo to work for the local landlord, Frank Taaffe.  Ó Raifteirí's mother was a Brennan from the Kiltimagh area. She and her husband had nine children. Antoine was an intelligent and inquisitive child.  Some time between 1785 and 1788, Antoine Ó Raifteirí's life took a huge turn.  It all started with a cough.  Soon two of the children began experiencing headaches.  Another child had a high fever.  A rash appeared on Antoine's hand.  It caused severe itching.  Soon the children were covered in that same rash.  They had contracted smallpox.  Within three weeks, eight of the nine children had died. One of the last things young Antoine saw before going blind was his eight siblings laid out dead upon the floor.

As Ó Raifteirí's father was a weaver, he had not experienced the worst of that era's poverty, but it would be much more difficult for his son to escape hardship.  He lived by playing his fiddle and performing his songs and poems in the mansions of the Anglo-Irish gentry. His work draws on the forms and idiom of Irish poetry, and although it is conventionally regarded as marking the end of the old literary tradition, Ó Raifteirí and his fellow poets did not see themselves in this way.

In common with earlier poets, Antóin had a patron in Taaffe.  One night Frank sent a servant to get more drink for the house.  The servant took Antóin with him, both of them on one of Franks good horses.  Whatever the cause (said to be speeding) Antóin's horse left the road and ended up in the bog, drowned or with a broken neck.  Frank banished Antóin and he commenced the life of an itinerant.  According to An Craoibhín (Douglas Hyde) one version of the story is that Antóin wrote Cill Aodáin (as DH Kileadan, County Mayo, his most famous work apart from Anach Cuan, to get back in Frank Taaffe's good books.  Taaffe however was displeased at the awkward way Antóin worked his name into the poem, and then only at the end.  Another version has it that Antóin wrote this poem in competition to win a bet as to who could praise their own place best.  When he finished reciting the poem his competitor is reported to have said "Bad luck to you Raftery, you have left nothing at all for the people of Galway" and refused to recite his own poem.

None of his poems were written down during the poet's lifetime, but they were collected from those he taught them to by An Craoibhín Aoibhinn Douglas Hyde, Lady Gregory and others, who later published them.

Ó Raifteirí was lithe and spare in build and not very tall but he was very strong and considered a good wrestler. He always wore a long frieze coat and corduroy breeches.

Ó Raifteirí died at the house of Diarmuid Cloonan of Killeeneen, near Craughwell, County Galway, and was buried in nearby Killeeneen Cemetery. In 1900, Lady Gregory, Edward Martyn, and W.B. Yeats erected a memorial stone over his grave, bearing the inscription "RAFTERY". A statue of him stands in the village green, Craughwell, opposite Cawley's pub.

Poetry
Ó Raifteirí's most enduring poems include Eanach Chuin and Cill Aodain which are still learned by Irish schoolchildren.

Eanach Chúin

Cill Aodáin
These are the opening two verses of "Cill Aodáin":

Legacy
The first four lines of "Mise Raifteirí an File" appeared on the reverse of the Series C Irish five pound note.

 The author James Stephens published English translations of poems attributed to Ó Raifteirí in his book Reincarnations. The American composer Samuel Barber wrote a composition for mixed chorus – also entitled Reincarnations – based on three of the poems translated by Stephens.
An annual festival, Féile Raifteirí, is held in Loughrea, Co. Galway each year on the last weekend in March. Ó Raifteirí spent most of his later years in townlands close to the town. The festival features a contemporary Irish language poet and promotes the native arts of Ireland. The festival ends with a visit to Raiftéirí grave in neighbouring Craughwell.
 Kiltimagh town square features a granite memorial in honour of Antoine Ó Raifteirí erected in 1985, in that same year Kiltimagh twinned with Craughwell, the final resting place of the blind Gaelic poet.
 Scoil Raifteirí, an All-Irish Primary School in Castlebar, County Mayo is named in honour of the poet.
 The Raftery Room Restaurant is located in Kiltimagh Main Street*
 Ó Raifteirí is mentioned in passing by IRA member Liam Devlin in Jack Higgins's 1975 novel The Eagle Has Landed.
 In 2011 Seán Ó Cualáin directed a feature film Mise Raiftearaí an Fíodóir Focal/I am Raifteirí, The Weaver of Words documenting the life of Ó Raifteirí, which was produced by Sonta Teo for TG4, and featured Irish actor Aindrias de Staic in the lead role as Ó Raifteirí.
 A street on the Ballymagroarty estate in Derry, Raftery Close, is named after Antoine Ó Raifteirí. All the streets in the estate are named after Irish writers.
 Sketch of Raifteirí http://www.irishpage.com/graf/raftery.gif
 In Radclyffe Hall's novel The Well of Loneliness, Stephen Gordon's horse is named Raftery after the Irish poet.
 Bob Dylan's 2020 song "I Contain Multitudes" contains the line "Follow me close, I'm going to Bally-na-Lee", presumed by Richard F. Thomas, Paul Muldoon, Brian Hiatt, and others to be a reference to Raifteiri's "The Lass From Bally-na-lee" ("Agus gluais go lá liom go Baile Uí Laí" / "So walk with me to Bally-na-Lee").

References

Further reading

External links
Famous Sons of Kiltimagh
Story of the Irish Poem
Raftery on Kiltimagh.net
Audio reading of Mise Raifteirí, an file
Scoil Raifteirí

Biography and poetry

1779 births
1835 deaths
18th-century Irish writers
18th-century Irish male writers
19th-century Irish writers
Irish blind people
Irish poets
Irish-language poets
Blind poets
People from County Mayo
People from County Galway